Nickelodeon is a Hungarian channel that is aimed at children. The channel launched in January, 2000, based on a block that the channel M-Sat launched in 1998. It broadcasts several Nickelodeon programs, Nickelodeon Hungary is served by the Pan-European Feed.

History
It was originally launched as a short block on August 1, 1998 on the youth entertainment channel M-Sat. On April 25, 1999 it had expanded to 12 hours, starting at 7AM. After M-Sat closed on October 5, 1999, the block was so successful that MTV Networks Europe decided to make a 12-hour channel out of the block. Nickelodeon Hungary started in January, 2000 in the place of formerly M-Sat.
From May 2004 to September 2012 was based on Nickelodeon Russia.

Programming

Current
 SpongeBob SquarePants (SpongyaBob Kockanadrág)
 Kamp Koral: SpongeBob's Under Years
 The Patrick Star Show
 It's Pony
 Middlemost Post Rugrats Big Nate Alvinnn!!! and the Chipmunks The Smurfs Nicky, Ricky, Dicky & Dawn (Nicky, Ricky, Dicky es Dawn)
 Henry Danger (Veszélyes Henry)
 The Fairly OddParents: Fairly Odder Warped! The Casagrandes The Thundermans (A Thuderman család)
 The Loud House (A Lármás család)
 Transformers: EarthSpark Noobees iCarlyNick Jr. Programming 
 Dora the Explorer (Dóra, a felfedező)
 PAW Patrol (A mancs őrjárat)
 Santiago of the Seas Baby Shark's Big Show! Blaze and the Monster Machines Ryan's Mystery Playdate Nella the Princess Knight The Adventures of Paddington Blue's Clues & You! Shimmer and Shine 
 Abby Hatcher Top Wing Rusty RivetsFormer programming
 Go, Diego, Go! (Go Diego Go!)
 The Wonder Pets (Csudalények – Minimentők)
 Tickety Toc (Tickety Toc)
 Sunny Day Rugrats (Fecsegő tipegők)
 My Life as a Teenage Robot (Az életem tinirobotként)
 All Grown Up!  (Felnövekvő fecsegők)
 Hey Arnold! (Hé, Arnold!)
 CatDog (MacsEb)
 Drake & Josh (Drake és Josh)
 The Mighty B! (B, a szuperméh)
 True Jackson, VP (True Jackson VP)
 The Adventures of Jimmy Neutron: Boy Genius (Jimmy Neutron kalandjai)
 Mr. Meaty House of Anubis (Anubisz házának rejtélyei)
 The Wild Thornberrys (A Thornberry család legújabb kalandjai)
 Rocket Power (Rocket Power)
 Rocko's Modern Life (Rocko)
 The Angry Beavers (Hódító hódok)
 Power Rangers Samurai (Power Rangers Samurai)
 Supah Ninjas (Supah Nindzsák)
 The Ren & Stimpy Show (Ren és Stimpy show)
 Aaahh!!! Real Monsters (Jaj, a szörnyek!)
 As Told by Ginger (Ginger naplója)
 Fanboy & Chum Chum (Fanboy és Chum Chum)
 Fred: The Show (Fred)
 Bucket & Skinner's Epic Adventures (Bucket és Skinner hősies kalandjai)
 Marvin Marvin (Marvin, Marvin)
 Kung Fu Panda: Legends of Awesomeness (Kung Fu Panda: A rendkívüliség legendája)
 Rabbids Invasion (Rabbids: Invázió)
 Rise of the Teenage Mutant Ninja Turtles The Penguins of Madagascar (A Madagaszkár pingvinjei)
 Teenage Mutant Ninja Turtles (Tini Nindzsa Teknőcök)
 The Fairly OddParents (Tündéri keresztszülők | Season 5-present)
 The Adventures of Kid Danger T.U.F.F. Puppy (S.T.R.A.M.M - A Kém Kutya)
 Sanjay and Craig (Sanjay és Craig)
 Sam & Cat (Sam és Cat)
 Bella and the Bulldogs (Bella és a Bulldogok)
 Harvey Beaks (Csõrös Harvey)
 Big Time Rush (Big Time Rush)
 Victorious (V, mint Viktória)
 The Haunted Hathaways (A Hathaway Kisértetlak)
 Avatar: The Last Airbender (Avatár - Aang Legendája)
 The Legend of Korra (Korra Legendája)
 Life with Boys (Fiúkkal az élet)
 Robot and Monster (Robot és Mumus)
 Bubble Guppies (Bubbi Gubbik)
 Olivia (Olivia)
 Ni Hao Kai-Lan (Ni Hao Kai-lan)
 Team Umizoomi (Umizoomi csapat)
 Winx Club (Winx Club)
 Max & Ruby (Max és Ruby)
 ChalkZone'' (Krétazóna)

Logos

References

External links
 Official Site

Hungary
Television channels and stations established in 1998
Television channels and stations established in 2000
Television channels and stations disestablished in 1999
Television channels in Hungary
Children's television channels in Hungary
1998 establishments in Hungary
2000 establishments in Hungary
Hungarian-language television stations